Josh Rhett Noble (born September 6, 1980) is an American stage, television, film and voice actor. Noble is best known for his role as Gaston in Disney's Beauty and the Beast in theaters across the country, various guest star roles in television including stints in Law & Order: SVU and the Jay-Z produced TIME: The Kalief Browder Story and for providing voice and motion capture for the Rockstar produced video game Red Dead Redemption 2. He is the recipient of the 2011 BroadwayWorld Award for Best Actor in a Musical for his portrayal of Matthew in Altar Boyz as well as the 2013 BroadwayWorld Award for Best Actor in a Play for his portrayal of Adam in Next Fall.

Biography

Early life
Noble was born at Crawford Long Hospital in Atlanta, Georgia. The son of the late Janet Brown Noble and the late Lamar Noble, Josh grew up in the small town of Tallapoosa, Georgia along with his older brother, Jason.  As a 6-year-old performer, he graduated from entertaining his family and friends to the stage with the community’s production of Down by the Creek Bank.

Noble attended Haralson County High School, where he continued to perform locally and abroad, and was awarded the Lisa Bowlin Abney Performing Arts Memorial Award for Excellence in the Arts. Graduating Salutatorian, an honor graduate, and voted "Most Intellectual", Noble studied musical theatre and film at the University of Miami.

Career
Noble's theatre career has spanned over 70 professional productions in theaters across the U.S.

Noble won acclaim for his work as Gaston in Disney's Beauty and the Beast beginning in 2004, and while in the Cleveland, Ohio, production of the show, he was called the "show-stealer" and "phenomenal".

Noble has also starred as Matthew in the Atlanta, Georgia, and Cleveland, Ohio, premiers of Altar Boyz, for which he also received critical acclaim.  For the Atlanta production, Noble was hailed as the leader of the "marvelous" cast.  In Cleveland, Noble was called "spot on", and the "singing standout" of the show.  In 2010, Noble reprised the role of Matthew in Cleveland, Ohio at the Hanna Theatre in Playhouse Square where he was awarded the 2011 BroadwayWorld Award for Best Actor in a Musical.

In addition to his work in Beauty and the Beast and Altar Boyz, Noble has performed in multiple regional premieres, including his BroadwayWorld Award Winning performance in Next Fall (Adam) and the Florida regional premiere of 9 to 5 (Franklin Hart, Jr.). Other notable performances include shows such as Company (Bobby), Forever Plaid (Sparky/Smudge), Camelot (Lancelot), Godspell (Judas), The Sound of Music (Captain von Trapp), The Pajama Game (Sid), The Fantasticks (Matt), Jekyll & Hyde (Stride/Utterson), Little Shop of Horrors (Audrey II Voice), Guys and Dolls (Sky), The Music Man (Harold), Grease (Kenickie) and Lend Me a Tenor (Max). Noble was also seen in the world premiere of the play OSWALD, based on the interrogation of suspected presidential assassin Lee Harvey Oswald, which played at the Richmond Shepard Theatre in New York City.

Noble was most recently seen in David Henrie's directorial film debut, This Is the Year, produced by Selena Gomez, the new Bruce Willis film, Wrong Place, the new Fox TV series Monarch, and in the new comedy Finding Happy on Bounce.

Filmography

Film

Video Games

Television

References

External links
 official website

1980 births
American male musical theatre actors
University of Miami Frost School of Music alumni
Living people
People from Atlanta